Chen Yuying (born October 1933) is a Chinese engineer and politician. She was a member of the 13th and 14th Central Committee of the Chinese Communist Party.

Biography
Chen was born in Changzhou, Jiangsu, in October 1933. Sjoined the Chinese Communist Party (CCP) in September 1952. In 1962, she enrolled at East China Institute of Textile Science and Technology (now Donghua University), majoring in cotton spinning, where she graduated in 1962. 

Beginning in 1946, she served in several posts at Dacheng No. 1 Textile Factory, including worker, party branch secretary, and workshop director. In 1975, she was promoted to become factory manager of Changzhou No. 3 National Cotton Factory, a position she held until 1981.

Chen got involved in politics in 1981, when she was appointed deputy director of Changzhou Textile Industry Bureau and vice president of Jiangsu Provincial Trade Unions Federation. In 1983, she became deputy party secretary of Changzhou, rising to party secretary the next year. She also served as chairwoman of Changzhou Municipal People's Congress from 1984 to January 1998.

References

1933 births
Living people
People from Changzhou
Donghua University alumni
People's Republic of China politicians from Jiangsu
Chinese Communist Party politicians from Jiangsu
Members of the 13th Central Committee of the Chinese Communist Party
Members of the 14th Central Committee of the Chinese Communist Party